Naumov is a surname. Notable people with the name include:

  Aleksandr Naumov (1868-1950) was a Russian Minister of Agriculture
 Aleksander Aleksandrovich Naumov (1935, Podolsk, USSR — 2010, Saint Petersburg, Russia), Soviet and Russian painter
 Aleksey Sergeyevich Naumov (born 1972), Russian professional footballer
 Andriy Naumov (born 1973), a Ukrainian athlete
 Hristo Naumov Shopov (born 1964, Sofia), Bulgarian actor
 Ivan Naumov, Bulgarian revolutionary
 Lev Naumov, Russian classical pianist, composer and educator
 Marija Naumova (born 1973, in Latvia), Russian Latvian singer
 Maryana Naumova (born 1999), Russian powerlifter
 Nikolai Naumov (1838–1901), Russian writer
 Radomir Naumov, Serbian politician
 Riste Naumov, Macedonian professional footballer
 Sergejs Naumovs (born 1969), Latvian professional ice hockey goaltender
 Stanislav Naumov (born 1972), Russian politician
 Vadim Naumov, 1994 World champion pair skater
 Vladimir Naumov (1927–2021), Russian film director and writer
 Yuri Naumov (born 1962), Russian born poet, composer, singer and acoustic guitar player

See also
 Naumova

Bulgarian-language surnames
Macedonian-language surnames
Serbian surnames
Russian-language surnames